The Namhae Bridge is a suspension bridge that connects Hadong Noryang and Namhae Noryang, South Korea.  The bridge, completed in 1973 has a total length of 660 meters. The bridge has a real-time monitoring system installed to monitor its performance.

See also
Busan
Transportation in South Korea
 List of bridges in South Korea

References

Bridges in South Korea
Suspension bridges in South Korea
Bridges completed in 1973